The 2014 Grote Prijs Jef Scherens was the 48th edition of the Grote Prijs Jef Scherens cycle race and was held on 14 September 2014. The race started and finished in Leuven. The race was won by André Greipel.

Teams
20 teams and 150 riders started the race.

 
 
 
 
 
 
 
 
 Netherlands (national team)

Results

References

External links

2014
2014 in road cycling
2014 in Belgian sport